Imotsko Polje is a polje (karstic field) located on the border of Croatia and Bosnia and Herzegovina near the city of Imotski.

References

Plains of Croatia
Geology of Croatia
Geology of Bosnia and Herzegovina